"Jack and Jill" is a 1978 hit song by R&B vocal group Raydio. It was the first single from their debut album Raydio, and became an international top 10 hit. It reached number eight on the U.S. Billboard Hot 100 and number six on the Cashbox Top 100. It reached number five in Canada, number four in Australia, and the top twenty in UK. It was the first of five U.S. top 10 singles by Ray Parker Jr. and/or Raydio.

The song describes how "Jack" is lonely and so, in spite of his good intentions, wanders down the hill to find love elsewhere after being neglected by "Jill," who is seldom home.

Record World called it "a mid-tempo r&b song that expands on the nursery rhyme in interesting fashion."

In 1981, "A Woman Needs Love (Just Like You Do)" became a hit as an answer song to "Jack and Jill". Parker wrote an antithesis from "Jill's" perspective, according to the lyrics, "By the time poor Jack returned up the hill, somebody else had been loving Jill."

In 1982, Parker recorded an extended version of the song. It was released on a re-issue of his second solo album. In this version, Parker performed all of the vocals instead of just some of them.

Personnel

Raydio
Ray Parker Jr. – guitars, chorus lead vocals
Jerry Knight – bass, first lead vocals
Arnell Carmichael – second lead vocals

Additional personnel
Ollie E. Brown – drums
Sylvester Rivers – piano
Sylvia Duckworth – background vocals
Valerie Jones – background vocals
Francine Pearlman – background vocals
Rochelle Runnels – background vocals
Janice Williams – background vocals
 from the band Stargard

Chart performance

Weekly charts

Year-end charts

References

External links
 Lyrics of this song
 

1977 songs
1977 debut singles
Ray Parker Jr. songs
Songs written by Ray Parker Jr.
Arista Records singles
Songs about infidelity